Charlotte Olajumoke Obasa (née Blaize; January 7, 1874 – December 23, 1953) was a Nigerian socialite and philanthropist. She was the daughter of the merchant R. B. Blaize and the wife of the physician Orisadipe Obasa.

Life
A Saro, Obasa was born as one of the children of Richard Beale Blaize, a wealthy and politically active businessman, and his wife Emily Cole Blaize. Her formative years were spent in Lagos, where her father published the nationalist newspapers The Lagos Times and Gold Coast Colony Advertiser and The Lagos Weekly Times. She was very well educated, first at what is today the Anglican Girls' School in Lagos, then at an institution in England.

In 1902, she married the Saro prince Orisadipe Obasa. Her father gave the couple a new house as a wedding present; it eventually came to be called Babafunmi House as a result. Obasa and her husband went on to have five children together.

An aunt of Kofo, Lady Ademola, Obasa was an entrepreneur and philanthropist who championed women's rights and education. In 1907 the Lagos School for Girls, later called the Wesleyan Girls' High School, was opened through her efforts in a property she lent the school. In 1913 she founded the first motor transport company in Lagos, the Anfani bus service, and had three trucks, three taxis and six buses in operation by 1915.

Obasa also served as a prominent esotericist. In 1914, she co-founded the Reformed Ogboni Fraternity. She was recognized as its first Iya Abiye, or lady master, in the same year.

She died in 1953.

References

Sources
 
 
 
 

Nigerian philanthropists
Nigerian princesses
1874 births
1953 deaths
Yoruba princesses
Princesses by marriage
Founders of Nigerian schools and colleges
Saro people
Yoruba women philanthropists
Nigerian company founders
Yoruba women in business
Nigerian socialites
People from colonial Nigeria
History of women in Lagos
Businesspeople from Lagos
Esotericists
People from Lagos Colony